Stronger is the second album from Myron Butler & Levi, released on August 28, 2007.

Track listing

References

Myron Butler & Levi albums
2007 live albums